Gogol is a town and suburb of the city of Margao in South Goa district in the state of Goa, India. Gogol is a well connected suburb with good infrastructure such as schools, colleges, post office, banks, public transport, shopping areas close to Margao city.

Education 
Parvatibai Chowgule College of Arts and Science and Manovikas English Medium School are situated in Gogol.

Landmarks and Attractions 
Chinmaya Mission Ashram and Good News Church which is also known as Goa Community Centre are located in Gogol.

Transport 
The nearest airport to Gogol is Dabolim Airport which is 26 km away from it. The nearest railway station is around 5 km away from Gogol.

See also
Margao
Panaji

Notes 

Cities and towns in South Goa district